Lake Preston is a lake located adjacent to and northeast of the city of Lake Preston, South Dakota.  The lake is near and directly north of Lake Whitewood.

The lake has the name of William C. Preston, a United States Senator from South Carolina.

See also
List of South Dakota lakes

References

Preston
Lakes of Kingsbury County, South Dakota